Quail Valley Elementary School can refer to:
 Quail Valley Elementary School, Menifee Union School District, Menifee, California
 Quail Valley Elementary School, Palmdale School District, Palmdale, California
 Quail Valley Elementary School, Fort Bend Independent School District, Missouri City, Texas